This is a list of the songs from the United Kingdom TV Show, Britannia High.
The songs feature artists Mitch Hewer as Danny, Georgina Hagen as Lauren, Sapphire Elia as Claudine, Matthew James Thomas as Jez, Marcquelle Ward as BB, and Rana Roy as Lola.

Britannia High songs
Britannia High